The 379th Expeditionary Operations Group is a provisional United States Air Force unit assigned to the United States Air Forces Central. It is the flying component of the 379th Air Expeditionary Wing, stationed at Al Udeid AB, Qatar.  The Group is the flying component of the 379th Air Expeditionary Wing, with more than 90 combat and support attached aircraft, including eight coalition airframes. Aircraft come from every US service, the United Kingdom, and Australia.

The group was first activated in September 1991 as part of the Objective Wing reorganization of the Air Force.  It deployed crews and aircraft to support Desert Storm before inactivating in December 1993.

Assigned units

 7th Expeditionary Airborne Command and Control Squadron (E-8)
 340th Expeditionary Air Refueling Squadron (KC-135)
 379th Expeditionary Aeromedical Evacuation Squadron
 379th Expeditionary Operations Support Squadron
 746th Expeditionary Airlift Squadron (C-130H/J, C-21)
 763d Expeditionary Reconnaissance Squadron (RC-135)
 816th Expeditionary Airlift Squadron (C-17)

History

The group was activated at Wurtsmith Air Force Base, Michigan in September 1991 as the Air Force converted its units to the Objective Wing organization.  During Desert Storm it deployed aircrew and aircraft to the Middle East.  Wurtsmith closed on 30 June 1993 as a result of the 1991 Base Realignment and Closure (BRAC) process, which determined that the development of new weapons and long-range satellite surveillance systems rendered many installations unnecessary. On the morning of 15 December 1992, the last Boeing B-52G Stratofortress, serial 57-6492, the "Old Crow Express," was flown to Davis–Monthan Air Force Base, Arizona for storage.  The group was inactivated two weeks later.

The group was reactivated in 2003 as the 379th Expeditionary Operations Group. Engaged in combat operations as part of Global War on Terrorism.

Lineage
 Established as the 379th Operations Group on 29 August 1991
 Activated on 1 September 1991
 Inactivated on 31 December 1992
 Redesignated 379th Expeditionary Operations Group and converted to provisional status on 4 December 2001
 Activated in 2003

Assignments
 379th Bombardment Wing, 1 September 1991 – 31 December 1993
 379th Air Expeditionary Wing, 2003 – present

Components
 379th Operations Support Squadron, 1 September 1991 – 31 December 1992
 524th Bombardment Squadron, 1 September 1991 – 15 December 1992
 920th Air Refueling Squadron, 1 September 1991 – 1 June 1992

Stations
 Wurtsmith Air Force Base, Michigan, 1 September 1991 – 31 December 1993
 Al Udeid Air Base, Qatar, 2003 – present

Aircraft assigned
 Boeing B-52G Stratojet, 1991-1992
 RC-135 Rivet Joint – present
 E-8 JSTARS – present
 KC-135 Stratotanker, 1991-1992,  – present
 C-130 Hercules – present
 C-21 – present
 B-1B Lancer – present
 Lockheed Martin F-22 Raptor, June 2019 - present

References

Notes

Bibliography

External links

 Bendiner, Elmer. The Fall of the Fortress. A Personal Account of the Most Daring -and Deadly- American Air Battles of World War II. New York: G.P. Putnam's Sons, 1980.
 Cassens, Kenneth H. Screwball Express: A Meaningful Tribute to the 8th Air Force, 379th Bomb Group & the Screwball Express. Paducah, Kentucky: Turner Publications, 1992.
 Robb, Derwyn D. Shades of Kimbolton, a Narrative of the 379th Bombardment Group (H). San Angelo, Texas: Newsfoto Publishing Company, 1946 (2nd edition 1981).
 379th Bombardment Group Association

379
Operations groups of the United States Air Force